Maximus Lobo is a fictional character, a mutant appearing in American comic books published by Marvel Comics. His first appearance was in The Uncanny X-Men #417.

Fictional character biography
Maximus Lobo is part of a group of mutants that bears a striking resemblance to that of werewolves. He runs the company Lobo Technologies, which is a division of Worthington Enterprises owned by the veteran X-Man Archangel.

In White Plains, New York, where Lobo Technologies is located, Maximus Lobo and more of his kind, the self-fashioned Dominant Species, slaughtered a small group of humans, but spared the mutant girl who was present. When a team of X-Men went to investigate this murder, Lobo fought and defeated Wolverine in a relatively short time. Lobo and the others then engaged the rest of the X-Men there and forced them to retreat.

Lobo and his pack caught up to Archangel and Husk, and tried to kill them off. There, he claimed to have killed Archangel's father. Lobo and his werewolves pursued the two mutants back to Lobo Technologies, where it was revealed that Lobo was planning to illegally sell Stark Enterprises products under the Lobo Technologies logo. When the rest of the X-Men arrived to help Archangel and Husk, Lobo created an explosion to cover his escape.

Lobo and the Dominant Species later returned when the dimension-hopping Exiles teamed up with the X-Men to battle an alternate reality version of Havok. Lobo sought to sway the young lupine mutant named Nicholas Gleason to his cause.

During the "Dark Reign" storyline, Maximus is revealed to have lost his mutant powers during the M-Day when Quasimodo researched him. His assessment to Norman Osborn stated that he would've made a good ally if he wasn't depowered. Maximus was later confronted by a vengeful Nicholas Gleason after the events of the Messiah Complex.

Powers and abilities
Maximus Lobo is a lycanthrope able to assume a werewolf form with superhuman strength, speed, agility, stamina, reflexes, hyper-keen senses, and razor sharp claws and fangs. He also appeared to have some form of healing factor and extremely durable bones given his ability to survive attacks from Wolverine's adamantium claws. He bragged that his bones had evolved to be naturally stronger than adamantium.

References

External links
 Maximus Lobo at Marvel Wiki

Characters created by Chuck Austen
Lobo
Lobo
Lobo
Lobo
Lobo
Lobo
Lobo
Lobo
Lobo